Newman School may refer to:
 United Kingdom
 The John Henry Newman School -  Hertfordshire, England
 United States
 The Newman School - Boston, Massachusetts
 Isidore Newman School - New Orleans, Louisiana

See also
 Cardinal Newman (disambiguation) for any school named after Cardinal Newman